The Real Teatro di San Carlo ("Royal Theatre of Saint Charles"), as originally named by the Bourbon monarchy but today known simply as the Teatro (di) San Carlo, is an opera house in Naples, Italy, connected to the Royal Palace and adjacent to the Piazza del Plebiscito. It is the oldest continuously active venue for opera in the world, having opened in 1737, decades before either Milan's La Scala or Venice's La Fenice.

The opera season runs from late November to July, with the ballet season taking place from December to early June. The house once had a seating capacity of 3,285, but has now been reduced to 1,386 seats. Given its size, structure and antiquity, it was the model for theatres that were later built in Europe.

History of the opera house
Commissioned by the Bourbon King Charles VII of Naples (Carlo VII in Italian), Charles wanted to endow Naples with a new and larger theatre to replace the old, dilapidated, and too-small Teatro San Bartolomeo of 1621, which had served the city well, especially after Scarlatti had moved there in 1682 and had begun to create an important opera centre which existed well into the 1700s.

Thus, the San Carlo was inaugurated on 4 November 1737, the king's name day, with the performance of the opera Domenico Sarro's Achille in Sciro, which was based on the 1736 libretto by Metastasio which had been set to music that year by Antonio Caldara. As was customary, the role of Achilles was played by a woman, Vittoria Tesi, called "Moretta"; the opera also featured soprano Anna Peruzzi, called "the Parrucchierina" and tenor Angelo Amorevoli. Sarro also conducted the orchestra in two ballets as intermezzi, created by Gaetano Grossatesta, with scenes designed by Pietro Righini. The first seasons highlighted the royal preference for dance numbers, and featured among the performers famous castrati.

In the late 18th century, Christoph Willibald Gluck was called to Naples by the impresario Tufarelli to direct his 1752 Clemenza di Tito at the theatre, and Johann Christian Bach in 1761-62 brought two operas, Catone in Utica and Alessandro nell'Indie.

1737: Construction of the Teatro di San Carlo
The new opera house was designed by Giovanni Antonio Medrano, a military architect. Angelo Carasale, the former director of the San Bartolomeo held the primary responsibility for designing the elaborate furnishings of the Teatro di San Carlo. The horseshoe-shaped auditorium is the oldest in the world. It was built at a cost of 75,000 ducats. The hall was 28.6 meters long and 22.5 meters wide, with 184 boxes, including those of proscenium, arranged in six orders, plus a royal box capable of accommodating ten people, for a total of 1,379 seats. Including standing room, the theatre could hold over 3,000 people. The fastidious composer and violinist Louis Spohr reviewed the size and acoustic properties of this opera house very thoroughly on 15 February 1817 and concluded that:

Much admired for its architecture, its gold decorations, and the sumptuous blue upholstery (blue and gold being the official colours of the Bourbons), the San Carlo was now the biggest opera house in the world. In relation to the power of the existing Bourbon Kingdom of the Two Sicilies, Beauvert notes that the design of the house, with its 184 boxes lacking any curtains was so that "no one could avoid the scrutiny by the sovereign" who had his private access from the Royal Palace.

In 1809 Domenico Barbaia was appointed manager of the royal opera houses in Naples and remained in charge until 1841. He soon established a reputation for innovative and dazzling productions, which attracted both the public and leading singers to the opera house.

February 1816 to January 1817: Destruction by fire and rebuilding

On 13 February 1816 a fire broke out during a dress-rehearsal for a ballet performance and quickly spread to destroy a part of building.

On the orders of King Ferdinand IV, another Bourbon monarch and son of Charles III, who used the services of Antonio Niccolini, Barbaia was able to rebuild the opera house within ten months. It was rebuilt as a traditional horseshoe-shaped auditorium with 1,444 seats, and
a proscenium, 33.5m wide and 30m high.  The stage was 34.5m deep. Niccolini embellished in the inner of the bas-relief depicting "Time and the Hour". 

The central frescoed ceiling painting of Apollo presenting to Minerva the greatest poets of the world was painted by Antonio, Giuseppe e Giovanni Cammarano.

On 12 January 1817, the rebuilt theatre was inaugurated with Johann Simon Mayr's Il sogno di Partenope. Stendhal attended the second night of the inauguration and wrote: "There is nothing in all Europe, I won’t say comparable to this theatre, but which gives the slightest idea of what it is like..., it dazzles the eyes, it enraptures the soul...".

In 1844 the opera house was re-decorated under Niccolini, his son Fausto, and Francesco Maria dei Giudice. The main result was the change in appearance of the interior to the now-traditional red and gold.

Late 19th century, post World War II, and 21st century renovations
Apart from the creation of the orchestra pit, suggested by Verdi in 1872, the installation of electricity in 1890, the subsequent abolition of the central chandelier, and the construction of the new foyer and a new wing for dressing rooms, the theatre underwent no substantial changes until repair of the bombing damage in 1943.

During World War II the opera house was damaged by bombs. Following the liberation of Naples in October 1943, Peter Francis of the Royal Artillery organized repairs to the damaged foyer and, three weeks later,  reopened the building with a musical revue. With the building in a fit state for performances, more musicians and singers made themselves available and the first opera performance was held on 26 December 1943, a matinee presentation of Puccini's La bohème. Francis stayed on for another two years, producing 30 operas.  On 9 July 1946 the American baritone Lawrence Tibbett sang the title role in Rigoletto before an audience that included senior military figures of the Mediterranean Theater of Operations, and troops of the Allied Forces.

By the start of the twenty-first century, the opera house was showing its age with outmoded stage machinery, inadequate visitor facilities, and lack of air conditioning. In response, the Campania regional government funded a €67 million renovation over six months in 2008 and six months in 2009 which included restoration of the décor and the creation of a new rehearsal hall. As noted in Gramophone magazine, the opera house reopened on 27 January 2010 with Mozart's La Clemenza di Tito, the 254th anniversary of the composer's birth: "The renovation work was completed last year under the direction of architect Elisabetta Fabbri and is intended to return Teatro San Carlo to its condition following Antonio Niccolini's rebuilding after the fire of 1816. The project....involved 300 workers day and night.

The great age of Neapolitan opera

At the time, Neapolitan School of opera enjoyed great success all over Europe, not only in the field of opera buffa but also in that of opera seria. The Neapolitan school of opera composers included Feo, Porpora, Traetta, Piccinni, Vinci, Anfossi, Durante, Jommelli, Cimarosa, Paisiello, Zingarelli, and Gazzaniga. Naples became the capital of European music and even foreign composers considered the performance of their compositions at the San Carlo theatre as the goal of their career. These composers included Hasse (who later settled in Naples) Haydn, Johann Christian Bach and Gluck.

Similarly the most prominent singers performed and consolidated their fame at the San Carlo. These included Lucrezia Anguiari, called "La Cocchetta", the renowned castrati Giovanni Manzuoli, Caffarelli (Gaetano Majorano), Farinelli (Carlo Broschi), Gizziello (Gioacchino Conti) and Gian Battista Velluti, the last castrato. Caffarelli, Farinelli, and Gizziello were products of the local conservatories of Naples.

Composers in residence
From 1815 to 1822, Gioachino Rossini was house composer and artistic director of the royal opera houses, including the San Carlo. During this period he wrote ten operas which were Elisabetta, regina d'Inghilterra (1815), La gazzetta, Otello, ossia il Moro di Venezia (1816), Armida (1817), Mosè in Egitto, Ricciardo e Zoraide (1818), Ermione, Bianca e Falliero, Eduardo e Cristina, La donna del lago (1819), Maometto II (1820), and Zelmira (1822).

Regular singers of the period included Manuel Garcia and his daughter Maria Malibran, Clorinda Corradi, Giuditta Pasta, Isabella Colbran, Giovanni Battista Rubini, Domenico Donzelli and the two great French rivals Adolphe Nourrit and Gilbert Duprez—the inventor of the C from the chest.

After the composition of Zelmira, Rossini left Naples with Colbran who had previously been the lover of Domenico Barbaia. The couple were married shortly thereafter.

To replace Rossini,  Barbaja first signed up Giovanni Pacini and then another rising star of Italian opera, Gaetano Donizetti. As artistic director of the royal opera houses, Donizetti remained in Naples from 1822 until 1838, composing sixteen operas for the theatre, among which Maria Stuarda (1834), Roberto Devereux (1837), Poliuto (1838) and the famous Lucia di Lammermoor (1835), written for soprano Tacchinardi-Persiani and for tenor Duprez.

Vincenzo Bellini, Sicilian by birth, also staged his first work, Bianca e Fernando, at the San Carlo.

Giuseppe Verdi was also associated with the theatre. In 1841, his Oberto Conte di San Bonifacio was performed there and in 1845 he wrote his first opera for the theatre, Alzira; a second, Luisa Miller, followed in 1849. His third should have been Gustavo III, but the censor made such significant changes that it was never performed in that version nor under that title (until a re-created version was given in 2004). It was later performed in Rome with significant revisions to the plot and its location, while the title became Un ballo in maschera.

Among the conductors and composers appointed by the Teatro San Carlo was the famous and eccentric French harpist and composer Nicolas-Charles Bochsa, who was accompanied by his lover, the English prima donna Anna Bishop, with whom he was touring the world. He conducted several operas (1844–1845) in the San Carlo with Anna Bishop as prima donna.  She sang there 327 times in 24 operas.

Decline and revival by late 19th century
The unification of Italy in 1861 led to Naples losing its status as the musical center of Italy and the home of the country's leading opera house to La Scala as power and wealth moved northwards. By 1874 the fall in income from performances led to the closing of the opera house for a year. Its fortunes were able to recover due to the continued support in the latter half of the nineteenth century and into the twentieth century by Giacomo Puccini and other composers of verismo operas, such as Pietro Mascagni, Leoncavallo, Giordano, and Cilea, who staged their works here.

In the late nineteenth century, the house created its own in-house orchestra under Giuseppe Martucci, which helped attract a number of respected conductors including Arturo Toscanini, Pietro Mascagni and composer Richard Strauss, whose influence expanded the opera house's repertoire.

One performer who did not appear in Naples from 1901 onward was Naples-born Enrico Caruso, who after being booed by a section of the audience during a performance of L'elisir d'amore, vowed never to return.

Conductors

Principal conductors
Elio Boncompagni  (1979 - 1982)
Salvatore Accardo (1993 – 1995)
Gabriele Ferro (1999 – 2004)
Gary Bertini (2004 – 2005)
Jeffrey Tate (2005 – 2010)
Nicola Luisotti (2012 – 2014)
Juraj Valčuha (2016 - 2022)
Dan Ettinger (2023–present)
Principal guest conductor
Maurizio Benini (2010 - 2011)
Honorary conductor
Zubin Mehta (2016–present)

See also
Music of Naples

References
Citations

Bibliography
Beauvert, Thierry (1985), Opera Houses of the World, The Vendome Press, New York, 1995. 

Lynn, Karyl Charna (2005), Italian Opera Houses and Festivals, Lanham, MD: The Scarecrow Press, Inc. 
Spohr, Louis, (trans./ed. Henry Pleasants, 1961), The Musical Journeys of Louis Spohr, Journey to Switzerland and Italy 1815–17.  Norman: University of Oklahoma Press

Further reading
Allison, John (ed.) (2003), Great Opera Houses of the World, supplement to Opera Magazine, London
Eisenbeiss, Philip (2013), Bel Canto Bully: The Life of the Legendary Opera Impresario Domenico Barbaja. London: Haus Publishing, 
Zeitz, Karyl Lynn (1991), Opera: the Guide to Western Europe's Great Houses, Santa Fe, New Mexico: John Muir Publications.

External links

 Teatro di San Carlo's official website  
 Teatro di San Carlo at Google Cultural Institute

Music in Naples
Theatres in Naples
1737 establishments in Italy
Theatres completed in 1737
Theatres completed in 1817
Tourist attractions in Naples
Neoclassical architecture in Naples
18th century in Naples
Opera houses in Naples
18th-century architecture in Italy
19th-century architecture in Italy